Lodovico Nava (19 April 1929 – 5 December 2016) was an Italian equestrian. He competed in two events at the 1960 Summer Olympics.

References

1929 births
2016 deaths
Italian male equestrians
Olympic equestrians of Italy
Equestrians at the 1960 Summer Olympics
Sportspeople from Modena